Style Wars is an American 1983 documentary film on hip hop culture, directed by Tony Silver and produced in collaboration with Henry Chalfant. The film has an emphasis on graffiti, although bboying and rapping are covered to a lesser extent. The film was originally aired on the television network PBS and was subsequently shown in several film festivals to much acclaim, including the Vancouver Film Festival. It also won the Grand Jury Prize: Documentary at the Sundance Film Festival.

The show captures and includes many historical moments of hip hop culture during its earliest days in the 1970s onward towards the early 1980s. Many film elements from Style Wars, including outtakes, are now housed at the Academy Film Archive as part of the Tony Silver Collection.

Background
The show shows the perspective of writers and their points of view on the subject of graffiti, as well as the views of then New York City Mayor Ed Koch. Graffiti writer Case/Kase 2, graffiti writer Skeme and his mother, graffiti "villain" Cap, now deceased graffiti writers Dondi, and Shy 147. Seen graffiti documentarian (and co-producer of the film) Henry Chalfant,  breakdancer Crazy Legs of Rock Steady Crew, police officers, art critics, subway maintenance workers, as well as several "people on the street".

While Style Wars promoted the idea that graffiti is a form of creative expression, not every person within the film held this same belief. In fact, throughout the film we see ways in which institutions such as the government and law enforcement tried arduously to prevent graffiti in New York City. For example, the city spent a large sum of money on negative subway advertisements that portrayed graffiti as a crime. On top of this, the mayor (who at the time was Ed Koch) pushed for the building of fences, with the intent of blocking off the entrances to subways, where graffiti artists would create their work. Additionally, he had police guard dogs put into these areas to scare away those who may enter. Both Koch and The New York City Police Department rallied to discourage graffiti.

Another perspective on graffiti shown in this film is that of well known artists. Many of them state that the reason why these teens spray paint murals on the sides of buildings is because they do not have any other place to do so, not because they want to intentionally break the law. Additionally, these individuals see potential for those that are involved in the culture beyond the streets. In the same way, they appreciate the art while simultaneously disagreeing with exactly how they do it. This in a way makes them middlemen within this documentary.

Reception and legacy
In 2009, A. O. Scott of The New York Times examined the film:

"Style Wars is a work of art in its own right too, because it doesn't just record what these artists are doing, it somehow absorbs their spirit and manages to communicate it across the decades so that we can find ourselves, so many years later, in the city, understanding what made it beautiful."

A 2018 review from The New Yorker also recommends the film, citing its soundtrack and its ability to capture the historical moment it centers on.

Pitchfork referred to the film as the "defining documentary of early hip-hop culture".

Featured graffiti artists

 Demon
 Se3
 Spank
 Dez
 Skeme
 Ces 157
 MinOne (NE)
 Iz the Wiz
 Quik
 Sach
 Dondi
 Seen UA
 Seen TC5
 Dust 
 Zephyr
 Revolt
 Wasp 1
 Noc 167
 Mare 139
 Kase2 
 Dee 5 
 Butch
 Trap
 Duro
 Soe
 Spin
 Zone
 Kid 
 Cap
 Daze
 Crash
 Paze
 Cey
 Futura
 Fred

Featured break dancers
Crazy Legs
Frosty Freeze
Ken Swift
Lenny Len
Kippy Dee
Lil' Crazy Legs
Take One
Ty Fly
Mr. Freeze
Doze
 Kid Glide
 Wavy Legs
 Kid Freeze
 Nelly Nell
 Eddie Ed
 Flip-a-matic
 Lil' Flip
 Junior Fastbreak
 Joly

Featured music
 "8th Wonder" by The Sugarhill Gang
 "The Message" by Grandmaster Flash
 "Beat Bop" by Rammellzee and K-Rob
 "Pump Me Up" by Trouble Funk
 "The Wanderer" by Dion
 "Rockin' It" by The Fearless Four
 "Jam Hot" by Johnny Dynell
 "Feel The Heartbeat" by Treacherous Three

DVD release

The digitally remastered DVD edition also contains:
 23 minutes of outtake footage
 Commentary and interviews by Tony Silver and Henry Chalfant
 Interviews with Style Wars editors Victor Kanefsky and Sam Pollard
 Art galleries by Blade, Cap, Cey, Crash, Crazy Legs, Daze, Dez, Dondi, Doze, Duro, Duster, Frosty Freeze, IZ the Wiz, Case/Kase 2, Kel First, Ken Swift, Lee, Mare139, Min One, Noc 167, Paze (Erni), Lady Pink, Quik, Rammellzee, Revolt, Sach, Seen UA, Shy 147, Skeme, Rafael 666, Tracy 168, and Zephyr
 Tributes to Dondi and Shy 147
 Guest interviews with Blade, Lee, Kel First, Seen, Tracy 168, Cap, MIN (NE), QUIK, IZ the Wiz, Fab 5 Freddy, Goldie, Guru, DJ Red Alert, and photographer Martha Cooper

2011 restoration auction
On June 9, 2011 it was announced that Red Hot Chili Peppers bassist Flea along with actors Brad Pitt and James Franco and director Spike Jonze were donating items to an eBay auction that would raise money for restoring the film negatives for Style Wars. The auction ended on June 11, 2011.

References in other media 

DJ Mutt used quotes from the movie in his song titled "Big Lights, Big City" taken from his album Treading Water. Black Star used a clip from the movie in the intro to the song "Respiration" on the Black Star album. The Drum and Bass group Ganja Kru, composed of DJ Hype, DJ Zinc, and Pascal, used quotes from the movie in their song titled "Plague That Never Ends". Swedish band The Radio Dept. used audio samples from the film in their single "Never Follow Suit" from the album Clinging to a Scheme.

References

External links

 Official site
 
 Style Wars on Rotten Tomatoes
 Style Wars on Folkstreams
 Style Wars on MUBI

1983 films
1983 documentary films
American documentary films
Graffiti in the United States
Documentary films about graffiti
Documentary films about hip hop music and musicians
Films shot in New York (state)
Films set on the New York City Subway
New York City hip hop
Sundance Film Festival award winners
1980s English-language films
1980s American films